St. Andrew’s-Sewanee School is a private, coeducational, Episcopal, boarding and day college preparatory school serving 216 students in grades six through twelve.  It is located in Sewanee, Tennessee on the Cumberland Plateau between Nashville and Chattanooga and adjacent to the University of the South, which is also affiliated with the Episcopal Church. In addition to outstanding college preparation, the school is known for its close and welcoming community, emphasis on creativity, and opportunities for outdoor adventure.

History
The University of the South agreed to merge the Sewanee Academy with St. Andrew's School in 1981.

Sewanee Academy was founded in 1867 as the Junior Department of the University of the South and later became Sewanee Grammar School (1869-1908), then the Sewanee Military Academy. In 1971, Sewanee Military Academy dropped its military program and became known as simply the Sewanee Academy, with a coeducational student body, for the next 10 years. After the 1981 merger and subsequent relocation, the former Academy property was given to the University's School of Theology for use; the school moved from the St. Luke's Hall on the main campus.

St. Andrew's School was founded in 1905 by the Episcopal Order of the Holy Cross (Anglican monastics) with the goal of "breaking the cycle of poverty" for "mountain boys." Originally all-white, St. Andrew's was desegregated in 1965.

A third school, St. Mary's School for Girls, was operated from 1896 to 1968 by the Episcopal Sisters of St. Mary's (also Anglican monastics). After St. Mary's closed, Sewanee Military Academy and St. Andrew's School, which had enrolled only boys, both became coeducational.

Student body and curriculum
The school is attended by approximately 220 day and boarding students in grades 6 to 12. The boarding program, which begins with grade 7, houses approximately 70 students from the United States and other countries. In an average year, the student body represents at least 20 states and a dozen countries. Qualified students are able to enroll in university classes at Sewanee: The University of the South.

Notable alumni and faculty

References

External links
 Official site

Boarding schools in Tennessee
Educational institutions established in 1868
Episcopal schools in the United States
Preparatory schools in Tennessee
Private high schools in Tennessee
Private middle schools in Tennessee
Schools in Franklin County, Tennessee
Sewanee, Tennessee
1868 establishments in Tennessee